Celso Vieira (born 25 September 1974) is a former Brazilian football player.

Club statistics

References

External links

Vegalta Sendai

1974 births
Living people
Brazilian footballers
Brazilian expatriate footballers
Brazil youth international footballers
J2 League players
Sport Club Internacional players
Ituano FC players
Associação Portuguesa de Desportos players
Vegalta Sendai players
Expatriate footballers in Japan
Association football midfielders